Mark Alan Barteau is an American engineer. He is Vice President for Research at Texas A&M University; holder of the Haliburton Chair in Engineering and professor in the Department of Chemical Engineering, College of Engineering; and professor in the Department of Chemistry, College of Science. Prior to joining Texas A&M, he was Director of the University of Michigan Energy Institute, University of Michigan Energy Institute and the DTE Professor of Advanced Energy Research at the University of Michigan.

Barteau was elected a member of the National Academy of Engineering for advancing the fundamental understanding of surface chemical-reaction mechanisms and for the design and invention of new catalysts. He is also an elected fellow of the American Association for the Advancement of Science and the National Academy of Inventors. He also previously served as the Senior Vice Provost for Research and Strategic Initiatives at the University of Delaware, where he held appointments as the Robert L. Pigford Endowed Chair of Chemical Engineering and Professor of Chemistry & Biochemistry.

References

University of Michigan faculty
21st-century American engineers
Stanford University alumni
Washington University in St. Louis alumni
Living people
Year of birth missing (living people)